Hart-Sport is Finland's oldest sports drink, which was originally designed 1980s in cooperation of Hartwall. The drink is available in liquid and powder form.

References

External links
 Hart-Sport

Sports drinks